The Shooting Iron Formation is a geologic formation in Wyoming. It preserves fossils of the Pliocene.

See also

 List of fossiliferous stratigraphic units in Wyoming
 Paleontology in Wyoming

References
 

Neogene geology of Wyoming